Frédéric Bey, born 20 April 1961 at Issy-les-Moulineaux in France, is a designer of wargames and the author of books and articles on the subject of military history.

Biography 
Frédéric Bey has done advanced studies on commerce and history. The wargames which he has designed cover ancient, medieval and Napoleonic military history. They have been published in Casus Belli and Vae Victis magazines as well as in several American magazines, such as C3i.

He is the organizer of the Trophée du Bicentenaire (Bicentennial Trophy), an annual international competition for wargaming whose objective is to commemorate the bicentennial of great victories of Napoleon.

A specialist in Napoleonic and Roman history, Bey is the author of a large number of articles on strategy in the ancient world and on the Napoleonic Wars which have appeared in Guerres & Histoire, De la guerre, La Revue Napoléon, Prétorien, Traditions, Histoires de France and Against the Odds magazines.

He has given many conferences on military history at the château de Vincennes under the auspices of the Centre d'Etudes d'Histoire de la Défense (CEHD), and has also been interviewed on France Inter (2000 Years of History) on the occasion of the bicentennial of the Battle of Austerlitz and at the Centre Culturel Irlandais de Paris in connection with a day celebrating Napoléon and Ireland.

An enthusiast of the Empire and strategy, Bey has published three books on the battles of Austerlitz, Jena, and Friedland for Quatuor Editions.

Selected works

Books 
 Austerlitz, la victoire exemplaire, Editions Quatuor, 2005
 Iéna et Auerstaedt, la victoire foudroyante, Editions Quatuor, 2006
 Rome, la légion romaine au service de l'Empire, Histoire & Collections, 2007
 Eylau et Friedland, la victoire avant tout, Editions Quatuor, 2008
 Alesia, The Victory of Roman Organisation, Histoire & Collections, 2011
 Issos and Gaugamela, Alexander defeats and dethrones Darius III, 333-331 BC, Cérigo Editions, 2020
 edited by Jean Lopez, La guerre antique, Éditions Perrin, 2021,
 edited by Jean Lopez 
 edited by Thierry Lentz and Jean Lopez, Les mythes de la Grande Armée, Éditions Perrin, 2022,

Articles 
 A regular contributor to the historical magazines Guerres & Histoire, Histoires de France, La Revue Napoléon and Prétorien and to the wargaming magazines Casus Belli, Vae Victis, C3i and Against The Odds.

Wargames 
Frédéric Bey has designed more than 70 wargames:
 Bellum Gallicum / Casus Belli No. 68 and No. 69 / 1992 
 Rivoli 1797 / Vae Victis No. 18 / 1997 
 Denain 1712 / Vae Victis No. 20 / 1998 
 Alesia 52 BC / Vae Victis No. 21 / 1998
 Pyramids 1798 / Vae Victis No. 23 / 1998 
 Poitiers 1356 and Formigny 1450 / Vae Victis No. 26 / 1999
 Zurich 1799 / Vae Victis No. 29 / 1999
 Suffren of The Indies / Vae Victis No. 34 / 2000
 Marengo 1800 / Vae Victis No. 35 / 2000 
 Jours de Gloire Campaign I : The Danub (Hohenlinden 1800, Austerlitz 1805, Wagram 1809) / Vae Victis No. 41 / 2001
 Canope 1801 / Canons en Cartons / 2001
 Imperator 161–217 A.D. / Vae Victis No. 42 / 2001
 By the Edge of the Sword (Bouvines 1214 and Benevento 1266) / Vae Victis No. 45 / 2002
 Montebello 1800 / Canons en Cartons / 2002
 Jours de Gloire Campaign II : Poland (Pultusk 1806, Eylau and Friedland 1807, Poland 1812–1813) / Vae Victis No. 47 / 2002
 Lonato 1796 / T&G module / C3i No. 14 / 2002
 Plutôt mort que Perse (Persian Wars, 492–479 BC) / Vae Victis No. 49 / 2003 
 Jours de Gloire Campaign III : France (Valmy 1792, France 1814) / Vae Victis No. 52 / 2003
 Sword of France (Auray and Cocherel 1364, Patay 1429, Castillon 1453) / Canons en Carton / 2003
 Semper Victor 305–374 A.D. / Vae Victis No. 56 / 2004
 Austerlitz 1805 (sud) / Vae Victis No. 58 / 2004
 Haslach and Elchingen 1805 / Canons en Carton / 2004
 The Cross and the Sword (Las Navas de Tolosa 1212) / Vae Victis No. 62 / 2005
 Austerlitz 1805 (North) / Vae Victis No. 64 / 2005
 Alésia 52 BC, Jurassian Hypothesis / Canons en Carton / 2005
 Dürrenstein and Schöngraben 1805 / Canons en Carton / 2005
 Trojan War / Vae Victis No. 66 / 2006
 Royal Swords (Brémule 1119, Taillebourg 1242, Mons-en-Pévèle 1304, Cassel 1328) / Canons en Carton / 2006
 Jena 1806 / Vae Victis No. 71 / 2006
 Maïda and Castel Nuovo 1805 / Canons en Carton / 2006* Schleiz, Saalfeld and Auerstaedt 1806 / Canons en Carton / 2007
 Ultimus Romanorum / Vae Victis No. 74 / 2007  
 Swords and Crown (Varey 1325, Baugé 1421, Verneuil 1424, Montlhéry 1465) / Canons en Carton / 2007
 Eylau 1807 / Vae Victis No. 77 / 2007
 Friedland 1807 / Canons en Carton / 2007
 Swords and Halberds (Morgarten 1315, Sempach 1386 and Grandson 1476) / Vae Victis No. 81 / 2008
 Borkowo 1806 / Vae Victis Hors-série No.10 / 2008 
 Norman Swords (Val ès dunes 1057, Varaville 1057 et Hastings 1066 / Canons en Carton / 2009
 Medina de Rioseco and Somosierra 1808 / Vae Victis No. 83 / 2008
 Roliça and Vimeiro 1808 / Canons en Carton / 2008
 Epées Normandes (Val ès dunes 1057, Varaville 1057 et Hastings 1066 / Canons en Carton / 2009
 Aspern-Essling 1809 / Vae Victis Collection Jeux d'Histoire / 2009* Gospitch and Ocaña 1809 / Canons en Carton / 2010* The Lion and the Sword (Tremetousia and Arsuf 1191) / Vae Victis Collection Jeux d'Histoire / 2010
 Sphactera 425 BC / Vae Victis No. 95 / 2010
 Almeida and Bussaco 1810 / Hexasim – Canons en Carton / 2010
 Germany 1813: from Lützen to Leipzig / Hexasim – Canons en Carton / 2011
 Fuentes de Oñoro, Foz d'Arouce and El Bodón 1811 / Vae Victis Collection Jeux d'Histoire / 2011
 Syracuse, 415-413 B.C. / Vae Victis No. 103 (Special Wargame Edition) / 2012 
 Sword of Sovereignty (Bouvines 1214 and Worringen 1288) / Ludifolie Editions - Canons en Carton / 2012
 The Bérézina 1812 - Battles for the Bridges / Ludifolie Editions - Canons en Carton / 2012
 Bellum Gallicum II / Vae Victis Wargame Collection / 2012 
 Alea Iacta Est, The Death of The Republic (49 to 29 B.C.) / Ludifolie Editions - Canons en Carton / 2013
 Hanau 1813 - The Heroïc Charge / Vae Victis Wargame Collection / 2013 
 The Dauphin and the Sword (Bastille de Dieppe 1443, Saint-Jacques-sur-la-Brise 1444 and Montlhéry 1465) / Ludifolie Editions / 2014  
 The Truce or the Sword (Ford of Blanquetaque 1475 and Guinegatte 1479) / Ludifolie Editions / 2014
 Amphipolis, 424-422 B.C. / Vae Victis No. 119 (Special Wargame Edition) / 2014
 Montmirail and Vauchamps 1814 - The Guard Leads the Attack / Ludifolie Editions - Canons en Carton / 2014
 Les Quatre-Bras and Waterloo 1815 - The Empire's Final Blows / Ludifolie Editions - Canons en Carton / 2015
 Arcole 1796 / Vae Victis Wargame Collection - Cérigo Editions / 2016
 Ligny and Wavre 1815 - The Empire's Last Victories / Ludifolie Editions - Canons en Carton / 2016
 Early Glories, Rivoli 1797 – Zürich 1799 – Montebello 1800 – Marengo 1800  / Vae Victis Collection Jeux d'Histoire - Cérigo Editions / 2017
 Hellespont, 411-410 B.C. / Vae Victis No. 139 (Special Wargame Edition) / 2018
 Heroes & Kings (Val ès dunes 1047, Taillebourg 1242, Cocherel 1364 and Patay 1429)  / Vae Victis Collection Jeux d'Histoire - Cérigo Editions / 2018
 Sfacteria 425 A.C. / Si Vis Pacem Para Bellum No. IV / 2018
 Issy 1815 / C3i No. 32 / 2018
 Blenheim 1704 AD / Turning Point Simulations / 2019
 Alexander against Persia, 334-331 BC - Granicus, Issos and Gaugamela / Vae Victis Collection Jeux d'Histoire - Cérigo Editions / 2019
 Three Days of Glory, Elchingen 1805 - Hollabrunn 1805 - Austerlitz 1805 / Vae Victis Collection Jeux d'Histoire - Cérigo Editions / 2021
 Les Quatre-Bras and Waterloo 1815 - The Empire's Final Blows (second edition) / Ludifolie Editions - Canons en Carton / 2021
 La Garde avance! Waterloo 1815: The Last Square / Vae Victis No. 161 (Special Wargame Edition) / 2022
 Early Glories, Rivoli 1797 – Zürich 1799 – Montebello 1800 – Marengo 1800 (second edition) / Vae Victis Collection Jeux d'Histoire - Cérigo Editions / 2022
 Aspern-Essling 1809 (second edition) / Vae Victis Collection Jeux d'Histoire - Cérigo Editions / 2022
 Nabis, The Last Spartan 195 BC / Vae Victis'' No. 167 (Special Wargame Edition) / 2023

Collaborations:

References 
 Frederic Bey Wargames Index on Boardgamegeek
 Index de référence des articles de Frédéric Bey par la Fondation Napoléon 
 France Inter – 2000 ans d'Histoire : "Le bicentenaire d'Austerlitz" 
 CEHD : " Simuler la bataille de Marengo : la non-reproductibilité de l’effet de surprise ". 
 CEHD : "Présentation de l’ouvrage de Frédéric Bey, Iéna, la victoire foudroyante" 
 CEHD : "Les capacités de projection de force de l’armée romaine au-delà des frontières de l’empire – Limites, réussites et échecs, à travers quatre exemples de campagnes : Bretagne, Germanie, Dacie, Mésopotamie"

External links 
 Official Web Site of Frédéric Bey
 Trophée du Bicentenaire
 Entretien avec Frédéric Bey sur Frog of War (2000) 
 Frédéric Bey's interview on YouTube channel Hexmagazine (2019)

1961 births
Living people
Board game designers